George G. Harrap, Ltd (officially: George G. Harrap and Company Limited, London, Bombay) is a now defunct publisher of high quality speciality books, many of them educational, such as the memoirs of Winston Churchill, or highly illustrated with line drawings, engravings or etchings, such as the much republished classic educational children's book The Cave Boy of the Age of Stone from at least 1901 into the 1980s.

In 1992, George G. Harrap and Co. was acquired and became part of Chambers Harrap of Scotland, a subsidiary of the French publisher CEP. Havas acquired CEP in 1997; Havas was then acquired by Vivendi in 1998. Vivendi sold its European book publishing to Lagardère Group in 2002.

In September 2009 the Edinburgh offices of Harrap, as part of Chambers Harrap, were closed. The Harrap's section has been moved to Paris, where, according to a press release by the owners, the plan is for Hachette Larousse publishers to manage it directly.

Book series
 Harrap's Bilingual Series 
 Harrap's Modern English Series
 Harrap's Shilling Library
 Harrap's Modern English Series
 Harrap’s Standard Fiction Library

References

External links 
 Children's books by George G. Harrap and Co. at Toronto Public Library

Publishing companies of the United Kingdom